Tan Fuying (15 October 1906 – 22 March 1977) was a Peking opera singer.


Life
Tan was best known for his "old man" roles  lǎoshēng) and was considered one of Peking Opera's "Four Great Beards"   , along with Ma Lianliang, Yang Baosen, and Xi Xiaobo. He served as a mentor to Li Yuru.

References

Citations

Bibliography
 .

External links
 "谭富英" on Baike.com 

1906 births
1977 deaths
20th-century Chinese male actors
Chinese male Peking opera actors
20th-century Chinese male singers
Singers from Beijing
Male actors from Beijing